Penguin Cafe Orchestra is the self-titled second studio album by the Penguin Cafe Orchestra, released in 1981, and recorded between 1977 and 1980. By this album, the line-up for the band had expanded greatly, with contribution including Simon Jeffes, Helen Leibmann, Steve Nye, Gavyn Wright of the original quartet, as well as Geoff Richardson, Peter Veitch, Braco, Giles Leamna, Julio Segovia and Neil Rennie. All pieces were composed by Simon Jeffes except for "Paul's Dance" (Jeffes and Nye), "Cutting Branches" (traditional), and "Walk Don't Run" (by Johnny Smith). The cover painting is by Emily Young.

"Cutting Branches for a Temporary Shelter" is based on the traditional Zimbabwean song "Nhemamusasa", a field recording of which can be  heard played on mbira on the Nonesuch Records album The Soul of the Mbira.

In 2021, Penguin Cafe Orchestra was named among the fifty best albums of 1981 by Spin.

Track listing
All tracks composed by Simon Jeffes; except where indicated

Side one

Side two

Personnel
Simon Jeffes - guitar, cuatro, ukulele, piano, bass, violin, Dulcitone, harmonium, shakers, drums, ring modulator, rubber band, penny whistle, electric organ

Braco - shakers, drums, bongos
Giles Leaman - oboe
Helen Liebmann - cello
Steve Nye - electric piano, cuatro
Neil Rennie - ukulele
Geoffrey Richardson - viola, guitar, bass, bongos, metal frame, ukulele
Julio Segovia - cymbals
Peter Veitch - accordion, violin
Gavyn Wright - violin

References

1981 albums
Penguin Cafe Orchestra albums
Albums produced by Simon Jeffes
E.G. Records albums